Yes L.A. is a six-song compilation EP featuring first-generation Californian punk rock bands. It was also the final release of the short-lived but influential Dangerhouse Records label.

Overview
A one-sided picture disc released at the twilight of the early Los Angeles punk scene, Yes L.A. features some of its most acclaimed bands: the Bags, the Eyes, the Alley Cats, Black Randy and the Metrosquad, X, and the Germs.

The record title makes parody of No New York, the seminal no wave compilation album issued a year earlier, perceived as pretentious by West Coast punkers. The EP even included a satirical disclaimer printed on the disc saying: "Not produced by Brian Eno".

The compilation includes a rawer early version of X's song "Los Angeles", recorded in 1978, which is, in the words of Dangerhouse Records co-founder David Brown, "a scathing, literal depiction of the scene which needs no explanation". The record also features a rare alternate mix of the Germs' "No God", a song originally produced by Geza X for the EP Lexicon Devil, previously released in May 1978.

The Yes L.A. EP has become highly sought after by record collectors.

Production and release
Yes L.A. was mastered by Jeff Sanders at Crystal Sound Studios in Hollywood, California.

All songs on the compilation were previously unissued, with the only exception of Black Randy and the Metrosquad's tune "Down at the Laundrymat", featured on the band's studio album Pass the Dust, I Think I'm Bowie from July 1979.

Yes L.A. was originally released in August 1979 on Dangerhouse Records, in a limited edition of 2,000 copies pressed on 12-inch clear vinyl discs.

Artwork and packaging
Designed by Pat Garrett, the record artwork was silkscreened by hand on the ungrooved side of each single disc, with one of three different color combinations, namely, green/black, green/blue, and green/red. Some of those copies were misprinted. Examples include discs with text only, with the background image in front of the text, or the image and text on the side with the grooves, rendering such a record unplayable.

Some non-silkscreened black vinyl test pressings are known to exist.

Original copies came without a sleeve, instead packaged in a clear plastic bag with a white cardboard backing.

Reissues
At some point during the 1990s, the rights to Yes L.A. (and the entire Dangerhouse Records catalog) were acquired by Frontier Records.

In June 2013, after 34 years out of print, Yes L.A. was reissued by Frontier in a one-time limited edition of 1,000 almost exact replicas of the original EP to commemorate the label's 100th release.

Track listing
Where it is necessary, songwriting credits are listed in the format lyrics/music.

Personnel

Bags
Alicia Armendariz (pka Alice Bag) – vocals
Patricia Morrison (pka Pat Bag) – bass
Craig Lee (pka Craig Bag) – guitar
Rob Ritter – guitar
Terry Graham (pka Terry Dad Bag) – drums
Eyes
Joe Ramirez – vocals, guitar
Jimmy Leach – bass, backing vocals
Joe Nanini – drums
David Brown – organ
The Alley Cats
Randy Stodola – vocals, guitar
Dianne Chai – vocals, bass
John McCarthy – drums
Black Randy and the Metrosquad
Black Randy – vocals
Bob Deadwyler – guitar
Keith Barrett (aka KK Barrett) – drums
Pat Garrett – bass
David Brown – electric piano
John Duchac (pka John Doe) – percussions (wastebasket)
X
Exene Cervenka – vocals
Billy Zoom – guitar
John Doe – bass, vocals
Don Bonebrake – drums
Germs
Darby Crash – vocals
Pat Smear – guitar
Lorna Doom – bass
Nicky Beat – drums
Don Bolles – backing vocals and hand clapping
Pat Delaney – backing vocals and hand clapping

Production
Dangerhouse – production (track 4), co-production (1 to 3, 5), remixing (6)
Geza X – production (6), co-production (1)
Eyes – co-production (2)
Randy Stodola – co-production (3)
Jimmy Nanos – co-production (5), engineering (5)
Pat Rand (Pat Garrett) – co-production (5), graphic design
X – co-production (5)
Mike Hamilton – engineering (4)
Jeff Sanders – mastering

See also 
 1979 in music
 Punk rock in California

Notes

References

External links
 "Frontier Reissues Rare Punk Classic: Yes LA EP!". Frontier Records.

Regional music compilation albums
1979 compilation albums
Punk rock compilation albums
Music of Los Angeles
Dangerhouse Records compilation albums